William Porter Craig (October 24, 1888 – ?) was an American football and basketball coach.  He was the seventh head football at Ottawa University in Ottawa, Kansas, serving for two seasons, from 1913 to 1914, and compiling a record of 5–7–2. Craig also coached basketball at Ottawa for two seasons.  Earlier, he was a prominent track athlete with the Kansas City Athletic Club.

In 1915, Craig accepted a position with the YMCA organization at Stockton, California.

Head coaching record

Football

References

1888 births
Year of death missing
Basketball coaches from Missouri
Ottawa Braves basketball coaches
Ottawa Braves football coaches
Sportspeople from Kansas City, Missouri